Yelvington is an unincorporated community in Putnam County, Florida, United States. It is located east of the Putnam County Fairgrounds in East Palatka, Florida.

Geography

Notes

Unincorporated communities in Putnam County, Florida
Unincorporated communities in Florida